John "Jackie" Barrett, ONL (born April 25, 1974, in Halifax, Nova Scotia) is a Canadian powerlifter.  Barrett, who has autism, has won thirteen gold medals competing for Canada in the Special Olympics World Summer Games and retired after setting three Special Olympics records at the 2015 Special Olympics World Summer Games in Los Angeles.

Jackie is a Halifax, Nova Scotia native residing in Corner Brook, Newfoundland and Labrador.

Biography

John "Jackie" Barrett was raised in Spryfield, a community in the urban core of Halifax. He currently resides in the Corner Brook area. 

In 1980, Jackie was diagnosed with autism, a learning disability, and a speech impairment.  He gradually regained his ability to talk at age six. 

Jackie spent most of his elementary school years in Special Education classes while he gradually normalized his academic and developmental abilities.  He was enrolled in a general academic program in Grade 7 and early Grade 8, and a full academic program starting his late Grade 8 year.

At age 13, a family friend suggested that Jackie should be involved with Special Olympics.  He decided to join the organization as a Swimmer.

During his high school years, Jackie lifted weights almost daily to help build his speed in Swimming.

At the 1994 Special Olympics Canada Summer Games in Halifax, his Team Nova Scotia Swimming Coaches took him to a Powerlifting competition and was amazed as how much weight they lifted.

Based on his coach's suggestions, Jackie took up Powerlifting in 1995 and retired from Swimming in 1996.  He competed in five appearances at the Special Olympics Canada Summer Games, and four appearances at the Special Olympics World Summer Games as a Powerlifter.

During his Special Olympics Powerlifting Career, Jackie has set numerous Nova Scotia, Newfoundland and Labrador, Special Olympics Canada, and Special Olympics World Records.

Education

Jackie has a Grade 12 Academic Diploma from J. L. Ilsley High School, and a Bachelor of Commerce degree from Saint Mary's University.

Awards and honours

Jackie Barrett was Sport Nova Scotia "Individual Male Athlete of the Year" runner-up for 1999-2000 and 2007–2008.

In 2015, Jackie was the first Special Olympian to be a Northern Star Award nominee.

Jackie was named Special Olympics Canada "Male Athlete of the Year" in 2000 and 2015, and "Dr. Frank Hayden Athlete Lifetime Achievement Award" recipient in 2015.

In 2019, Jackie was inducted into the Nova Scotia Sport Hall of Fame, becoming the first Special Olympian in its history to receive this honour.

On September 1, 2021, Jackie was invested into Order of Newfoundland and Labrador, the first Special Olympian to receive that province's highest civilian honour.

Jackie was officially inducted into Canada's Sports Hall of Fame through a virtual ceremony on October 3, 2021, a first Special Olympian and fifth Halifax native to receive Canada's highest permanent sports honour.

On October 22, 2022, Jackie was inducted into the "Newfoundland and Labrador Sports Hall of Fame", becoming the first Special Olympian to be an inductee to three provincial and national "Hall of Fames".

References 

Canadian powerlifters
Special Olympics
Nova Scotia Sport Hall of Fame inductees
1974 births
Living people
Sportspeople with autism
People with intellectual disability